Voleč is a municipality and village in Pardubice District in the Pardubice Region of the Czech Republic. It has about 400 inhabitants.

References

External links

Villages in Pardubice District